CK Deluxe (also known as Car Kulture Deluxe) is a magazine published by Geno DiPol and Koolhouse Publications, featuring Kustom Culture lifestyles, Pin-Ups, Hot Rods, Customs, and Artwork. This magazine has a huge cult following in the US and along with Ol' Skool Rodz (also published by Koolhouse) are considered by many as good references for the Modern Car Kulture Enthusiast.

The magazine was established by Petersen Publishing, Inc. in 1999. It was first named Hot Rod DeLuxe. The magazine is based in Vero Beach, Florida. In 2006 its frequency was set to bimonthly.

References

External links
 Car Kulture Deluxe Website

1999 establishments in Florida
Automobile magazines published in the United States
Bimonthly magazines published in the United States
Kustom Kulture
Magazines established in 1999
Magazines published in Florida